The Kuznetsov NK-93 was a civilian aircraft engine, a hybrid between a turbofan and a turboprop known as a propfan. The engine was also unique in having a separate duct around the contra-rotating propellers, as most other propfans are unducted. Once described in a respected aviation encyclopedia as "potentially the most fuel-efficient aircraft jet engine ever to be tested", the NK-93 was targeted for derivatives of Soviet/Russian airliners such as the Ilyushin Il-96, Tupolev Tu-204, and Tupolev Tu-330. Five in-flight engine tests were conducted on the NK-93 from December 2006 to December 2008.

Development
The NK-93 engine was developed beginning in the late 1980s, although the design of the engine was allegedly envisioned as early as 1968. Many of the design features were adopted from the Kuznetsov NK-92, the military complement to the NK-93. It was the last major project of Kuznetsov Design Bureau founder Nikolai Dmitriyevich Kuznetsov.

The NK-93 was originally scheduled for flight testing in late 1993/early 1994 and certification in 1997 so that it could be used on the Ilyushin Il-96M and Tupolev Tu-204M. By May 1994, seven full-size versions of the engine had been built, with five of them close to the production configuration. Due to the breakup of the Soviet Union, though, the schedule was repeatedly delayed because of severe funding shortages and other issues. However, by October 2001, a tenth NK-93 engine neared completion, out of a total of 15 planned engine prototypes.

The engine finally underwent flight testing on an Ilyushin Il-76LL testbed aircraft beginning on December 29, 2006, with a second flight occurring on May 3, 2007. A total of 50 flight test hours were planned. Testing was suspended again in June 2007 because of funding troubles. Airborne testing did not restart until October 2008, with flights on October 2 and 6. Another test flight occurred on December 15, 2008, but the NK-93 was removed from the testbed by May 14, 2009.

Supporters of the NK-93 claim that the amount of money needed to certify the engine is minuscule compared to the development costs of competing new Russian engines, which they regard as still inferior to the older NK-93.

In April 2014, Kuznetsov announced that it would resume work on the NK-93 engine.

Foreign interest
The advanced nature of the engine attracted the attention of airframers and engine manufacturers in other countries. By 1992, the NK-93 was already drawing interest from the Japanese aviation industry. Investors from South Korea were among the groups discussing investment in the NK-93 at the 2001 MAKS air show. In 2004, Airbus and the Kuznetsov Design Bureau studied the feasibility of using the engine to power Airbus commercial aircraft. German engine maker MTU Aero Engines purchased a Kuznetsov report on the noise characteristics of the NK-93 engine for 600,000 Deutsche marks. When the NK-93 was displayed on the Il-76LL demonstrator at the 2007 MAKS air show, Chinese aircraft manufacturers reportedly made a "tempting offer" to buy all of the NK-93's blueprints and documentation. In October 2013, the European Commission gave a three-and-a-half year grant to study the Innovative Counter rOtating fan system for high Bypass Ratio Aircraft engine (COBRA). COBRA was a European Union-Russia cooperative program to study an ultra-high bypass ratio (UHBR) counter-rotating turbofan (CRTF) that was similar to the NK-93. Participating organizations included Kuznetsov, CIAM, Russian propeller manufacturer Aerosila, French engine maker Safran (Snecma), the French aerospace laboratory (ONERA), and the German Aerospace Center (DLR).

Design
The NK-93 has a core that was developed from the NK-110, an unducted Kuznetsov propfan that was never built. The engine has a bypass ratio of 17 and is designed around a  planetary gearbox with seven satellites.

Applications

 Antonov An-70 (proposed twin-engine version)
 Antonov An-124 (proposed re-engine)
 Ilyushin Il-76LL (testbed)
 Ilyushin Il-96
 Sukhoi KR-860
 Tupolev Tu-154M3
 Tupolev Tu-204
 Tupolev Tu-330

Specifications

See also

References

Bibliography

 
 
 
 
 
 
 
 
 
 
 
 
 

Kuznetsov aircraft engines
Propfan engines